Union County is a county located in the U.S. state of Mississippi. As of the 2020 census, the population was 27,777. Its county seat is New Albany. According to most sources, the county received its name by being a union of pieces of several large counties, like other Union counties in other states. However, other sources say that the name was meant to mark the re-union of Mississippi and the other Confederate states after the Civil War (at the time, the state had a Republican government under Reconstruction).

Geography

Major highways
  Interstate 22
  U.S. Route 78
  Mississippi Highway 9
  Mississippi Highway 15
  Mississippi Highway 30
  Mississippi Highway 178
  Mississippi Highway 348
  Mississippi Highway 349
  Mississippi Highway 355

Adjacent counties
 Benton County (north)
 Tippah County (north)
 Prentiss County (east)
 Lee County (southeast)
 Pontotoc County (south)
 Lafayette County (southwest)
 Marshall County (northwest)

National protected area
 Holly Springs National Forest (part)

Demographics

2020 census

As of the 2020 United States Census, there were 27,777 people, 9,808 households, and 6,922 families residing in the county.

2000 census
As of the census of 2000, there were 25,362 people, 9,786 households, and 7,241 families residing in the county.  The population density was 61 people per square mile (24/km2).  There were 10,693 housing units at an average density of 26 per square mile (10/km2).  The racial makeup of the county was 83.42% White, 14.95% Black or African American, 0.13% Native American, 0.20% Asian, 0.02% Pacific Islander, 0.67% from other races, and 0.62% from two or more races.  1.63% of the population were Hispanic or Latino of any race.

As of the census of 2000, there were 9,786 households, out of which 34.70% had children under the age of 18 living with them, 58.90% were married couples living together, 11.10% had a female householder with no husband present, and 26.00% were non-families. 23.40% of all households were made up of individuals, and 11.30% had someone living alone who was 65 years of age or older.  The average household size was 2.57 and the average family size was 3.02.

In the county, the population was spread out, with 25.90% under the age of 18, 9.20% from 18 to 24, 28.50% from 25 to 44, 22.20% from 45 to 64, and 14.10% who were 65 years of age or older.  The median age was 36 years. For every 100 females there were 93.80 males.  For every 100 females age 18 and over, there were 90.00 males.

The median income for a household in the county was $32,682, and the median income for a family was $39,666. Males had a median income of $29,087 versus $21,418 for females. The per capita income for the county was $15,700.  About 9.60% of families and 12.60% of the population were below the poverty line, including 14.10% of those under age 18 and 20.80% of those age 65 or over.

Communities

City 
 New Albany (county seat and largest municipality)

Towns
 Myrtle
 Sherman (partly in Pontotoc County and Lee County)

Village
 Blue Springs

Unincorporated communities
 Alpine
 Enterprise
 Etta
 Ingomar
 Jugfork
 Keownville
 New Harmony
 Wallerville

Education
There are two school districts: New Albany Public Schools and Union County School District.

Politics

See also
 National Register of Historic Places listings in Union County, Mississippi

References

 
Mississippi counties
Counties of Appalachia
1870 establishments in Mississippi
Populated places established in 1870